Ron Bissett (8 November 1931 – 18 July 2015) was a Canadian basketball player. He competed in the men's tournament at the 1956 Summer Olympics.

References

1931 births
2015 deaths
Canadian men's basketball players
Olympic basketball players of Canada
Basketball players at the 1956 Summer Olympics
Basketball players from Vancouver